Isaac Atanga (born 14 June 2000) is a Ghanaian professional footballer who plays as a right winger for Turkish TFF First League club Göztepe, on loan from FC Cincinnati.

Club career

FC Nordsjælland
Atanga was born in Nkoranza, Ghana and was a part of the academy at Right to Dream and joined FC Nordsjælland in the summer 2018. Since Right to Dream is a cooperative academy to Nordsjælland, Atanga had already played a friendly game for FC Nordsjælland in February 2018 against FC Roskilde.

He made his FC Nordsjælland debut on 14 April 2019, replacing Oliver Antman in the 73rd minute in a 2–1 victory against Esbjerg fB in the Danish Superliga. He played with shirt number 35 on his back. Atanga had had a good season for the U-19 squad before his first team debut, scoring 9 goals in 15 games.

On 14 July 2019, Atanga scored his first professional goal for Nordsjælland in the first game of the season against AC Horsens, a game Nordsjælland won 3–0. He also scored one goal in the following game against FC Midtjylland. On 25 July 2019, the club announced that they had extended Atanga's contract until 2023.

FC Cincinnati
On 31 March 2021, Atanga joined Major League Soccer side FC Cincinnati, signing a three-year contract. He made his debut for the club on 1 May 2021 against Orlando City, starting in the 3–0 defeat. Atanga scored his first goal for FC Cincinnati on 27 August 2021 against Columbus Crew but couldn't prevent the 3–2 defeat.

On 7 August 2022 it was confirmed, that Atanga had joined newly relegated Turkish TFF First League club Göztepe on a one-year loan deal with a purchase option.

Career statistics

References

External links
 

2000 births
Living people
Ghanaian footballers
Association football wingers
FC Nordsjælland players
FC Cincinnati players
FC Cincinnati 2 players
Danish Superliga players
MLS Next Pro players
Major League Soccer players
Ghanaian expatriate footballers
Ghanaian expatriate sportspeople in Denmark
Ghanaian expatriate sportspeople in the United States
Ghanaian expatriate sportspeople in Turkey
Expatriate men's footballers in Denmark
Expatriate soccer players in the United States
Expatriate footballers in Turkey